Canned Heat may refer to:

 "Sterno Canned Heat", fuel made from denatured and jellied alcohol, designed to be burned directly from its can
"Canned Heat Blues", a 1928 song by Tommy Johnson on the drinking of alcohol from Sterno Canned Heat
Canned Heat, an American blues-rock band, named after the above song
Canned Heat (album), Canned Heat's 1967 debut album
"Canned Heat", a song on the band's 1969 Hallelujah album
"Canned Heat" (song), a 1999 single by Jamiroquai
Canned heat, a professional wrestling phrase
Fiocchi Munizioni 'Canned Heat' ammunition sealed in metal cans enhancing shelf life